Tracie D. Hall is an American librarian, author, curator, and advocate for the arts who has served as the executive director of the American Library Association since 2020. Hall is the first African American woman to lead the association since its founding in 1876.

Biography
Hall was born and raised in the Watts neighborhood of Los Angeles. 

She received a dual Bachelor of Arts degrees in law and society and African American studies from the University of California, Santa Barbara in 1991. She went on to receive a Master of Arts in international studies from Yale University and a Master of Library and Information Science (MLIS) from the University of Washington Information School, where she studied under Spencer Shaw. She received a Mover and Shaker Award from Library Journal in 2004. City mayor Eddie Perez designated February 13 "Tracie Hall Day" to acknowledge her service to community of Hartford, Connecticut.

Career

Prior to her appointment as ALA director, Hall served as the director of the Joyce Foundation Culture Program. She also served as Chicago's Deputy Commissioner of the Department of Cultural Affairs and Special Events. In libraries, Hall was vice president of the Queens Public Library and assistant dean of Dominican University Graduate School of Library and Information Science. She was the director of the Office for Diversity for the American Library Association from 2003 to 2006. Earlier in her career, she had worked at the Seattle Public Library and Hartford Public Library and run a homeless shelter in Santa Monica. In the private sector, she worked as community investment strategist at Boeing’s Global Corporate Citizenship Division. 

Hall is founder and curator of Rootwork Gallery, an experimental arts space in Chicago founded in 2016. She has served as a visiting curator at the School of the Art Institute of Chicago and a visiting professor at Southern Connecticut State University, Wesleyan University, and the Catholic University of America. A poet and playwright, Hall was a Cave Canem Foundation fellow.

In 2022, the National Book Foundation announced Hall as the winner of the  2022 Literarian Award for Outstanding Service to the American Literary Community.

Publications and Presentations
Tracie D. Hall has written about the digital divide,community disinvestment,  the right to read for the incarcerated,  and eradicating information poverty. She has written foundational work on the need for diversity in the library profession. 

Hall has been a frequent speaker at scholarly conferences. She gave the Bobinski Lecture at the University of Buffalo in 2022: "The urgency of information equity." In 2022 she was also keynote at the Connecticut Library Association: "Information Redlining: The Role of Libraries in Disrupting the Growing Socioeconomic Divide." She presented the keynote lecture at the United Kingdom Library Association in 2020: "Information Redlining: The Urgency to Close the Socioeconomic Divide and the Role of Libraries as Lead Interveners." In 2009 she keynoted at the International Federation of Library Associations in Bologna, Italy: "The 10 Ways Visionary Librarianship Can Change the World."

References

American librarians
American women librarians
Living people
Year of birth missing (living people)
Place of birth missing (living people)
20th-century African-American women
20th-century African-American people
21st-century African-American women
21st-century African-American people
University of California, Santa Barbara alumni
Yale University alumni
University of Washington alumni
Dominican University (Illinois) faculty
American Library Association people
Queens Public Library
Seattle Public Library
African-American librarians
American women academics